Dann eben mit Gewalt (also known as Violence: The Last Resort) is a 1993 German television film.

Cast
In alphabetical order (surname): 
 Wilhelm Beck
 Christine Buchegger
 Suavi Eren as  Aysche's father
 Ulrich Frank
 Regula Grauwiller as  Anne
 Michael Greiling as Headmaster
 Thomas Heinze as  Alex
 Charles Korvin
 Silvan-Pierre Leirich
 Thomas Luft
 Michael Mendl as  Schwarz
 Adele Neuhauser as Teacher
 Götz Otto
 Claudia Pielmann
 Krista Posch as Aysche's mother
 Herbert Schäfer as Didi
 Heinrich Schafmeister as Inspector (as Hinrich Schafmeister)
 Jürgen Schmidt as Martin's father
 David Steffen as Hassan
 Jasmin Tabatabai as  Aysche
 Jürgen Vogel as  Martin

External links
 

1993 films
1993 television films
German television films
1990s German-language films
Films based on Dutch novels
Television shows based on Dutch novels
German-language television shows
ZDF original programming